Austroargiolestes alpinus is a species of Australian damselfly in the family Megapodagrionidae,
commonly known as a New England flatwing. 
It is endemic to north-eastern New South Wales, where it inhabits streams and bogs.

Austroargiolestes alpinus is a large, black and pale blue damselfly, without pruinescence.
Like other members of the family Megapodagrionidae, it rests with its wings outspread.

Austroargiolestes alpinus is similar in appearance to Austroargiolestes brookhousei.

Gallery

See also
 List of Odonata species of Australia

References 

Megapodagrionidae
Odonata of Australia
Insects of Australia
Endemic fauna of Australia
Taxa named by Robert John Tillyard
Insects described in 1913
Damselflies